Nam Cheong North is one of the 25 constituencies in the Sham Shui Po District of Hong Kong which was first created in 1985.

The constituency loosely covers Sham Shui Po with the estimated population of 19,628.

Councillors represented

Election results

2010s

2000s

1990s

1980s

References

Constituencies of Hong Kong
Constituencies of Sham Shui Po District Council
1985 establishments in Hong Kong
Constituencies established in 1985
Sham Shui Po